S. Berugoda was the 38th Surveyor General of Sri Lanka. He was appointed in 1992, succeeding Thamotharam Somasekaram, and held the office until 1993. He was succeeded by N. C. Seneviratne.

References

B